Zhou Mengxue (born 20 February 2000) is a Chinese handball player for Anhui and the Chinese national team.

She participated at the 2017 World Women's Handball Championship.

References

2000 births
Living people
Chinese female handball players